Man-to-man defense, or man defense, is a type of defensive technique used in team sports such as American football, association football, basketball, and netball, in which each player is assigned to defend and follow the movements of a single player on offense. Often, a player guards his counterpart (e.g. center guarding center), but a player may be assigned to guard a different position. However, the strategy is not rigid, and a player might switch assignment if needed, or leave his own assignment for a moment to double team an offensive player. The term is commonly used in both men's and women's sports. The alternative to man-to-man defense is zone defense, a system of defense (as in basketball or football) in which each player guards an assigned area rather than a specified opponent.

Advantages 
The main reasons a team would want to play man-to-man are:

 More aggressive than the zone defense. 
 It also allows a team's best defender to stay on a player who has to be guarded at all times. In special cases teams can play a Box-and-one defense which is specifically designed to deny one specific enemy player by having  a defender never leave their side so that they cannot get the ball.
 No middle penetration
 Even if the attacker gets past his defender in a man-to-man defense they will get collapsed on by the rest of the defenders. They will either get the ball stolen from them, or forced to make a bad pass.
 Denies passes to the left and right wings
 Man-to-man not only puts pressure on the ball but on players that do not have the ball as well. The offense will usually have to do pick and rolls in order to pass it to a wing depending on the severity of the pressure.
 A great defense to build trust within the team
 When a dribbler gets past their defender it is not the worst thing that can happen, because the defender can rely on his team to back him up, or when defending against screens players have to communicate and trust each other. That is what man-to-man is all about.
 Defenders stay in a balanced stance 
 Defenders need to always be on their toes so they can react as soon as possible. The defender should always stay in a position that allows him to be able to stick out their arm full length in front and be able to touch the players they are defending.

Disadvantages 
Some risks and downsides of playing it:

 The disadvantage is that it allows the offensive team to run screens more effectively. 
 Because the defenders are each guarding their own man setting a screen on a defender is very easy to execute, but extremely hard to defend against. 
 It leaves weaker or slower defenders more exposed. In a man-to-man defense, those defenders are generally teammates staying close to their own assigned offensive player, and thus are often not in a good position to offer help should a weaker defender be eluded by the offensive player he is trying to guard.
 Communication is essential
 Teams need to be constantly talking with each other to run an effective defense. For instance, when a dribbler gets past a defender the defender needs to tell his team a guy got past him so that they can collapse and stop the dribbler from getting to the hoop. When the offense is setting screens and doing pick and rolls, the defense needs to be talking with each other as to whether they should stay with their man or switch. Communication can be an advantage or disadvantage depending on how proficient they are at it.

History of man-to-man 
Zone defenses were disallowed by the National Basketball Association in 1947. During this period, an illegal defense violation was called when a defender was either guarding an area instead of a specific offensive player or was double teaming an offensive player away from the ball. A rule change in 2001 eventually permitted zone defense but also specified that a defender who is standing inside the key is limited to not guarding an offensive player at arm's length for no more than three seconds. If the defender violates this rule, a technical foul is assessed against his team, and the opposing team is granted one free throw and subsequent possession of the basketball. This makes it difficult for NBA teams to play zone since such defenses usually position a player in the middle of the key to stop penetration.

Man-to-man defense is still the primary defensive scheme in the NBA, and some coaches use it exclusively.

Technique 
When defending the ball (i.e. guarding the man with the basketball) away from the basket in basketball, players typically should use a version of the following technique: the defender stands and faces the opponent. He is positioned halfway between the ball and the basket and may be angled in one direction or another depending on the defensive scheme of that defender's team. He has his feet positioned beyond shoulder width with most of the weight distributed to the balls of his feet. However, the defender's heels should not be off the floor as this will put him off balance. The defender's knees should be bent at roughly a ninety-degree angle with the bottom of his thighs parallel to the ground. This will place the defender's buttocks in a seated position. The defender's back should be straight with just a slight tilt forward. This will place the defender's head over the center of his body and maintain proper balance. Depending on the teachings of his coach, the defender should position his hands wide as if he were stretching his wingspan or place one hand high and one hand low. Keep at arm's length at all times. This allows the defender to be able to react quickly enough to anything that the attacker might do. It is ok to play a little farther back or even a little closer, it would just depend on how confident the player is in his abilities and the skill of the attacker. Keeping eyes on the opponent's chest is very helpful in reacting to their moves as well. It’s very easy for an offensive player to fake with their head, eyes, or body. The spot on a player that is most difficult to fake with is their chest.

See also
 Box-and-one defense
 Man-to-man marking
 Zone defense

References

Basketball terminology
Basketball strategy
Netball terminology
American football terminology
Water polo strategy
Water polo terminology
Ice hockey strategy
Ice hockey terminology